Drew Martin (born April 26, 1994) is an American professional basketball player who played last for Bahía Basket of the Argentine Liga Nacional de Básquet.

Professional career
Martin started his professional career with BBC US Hiefenech Heffingen in the Total League before signing with Tokyo Cinq Reves in the B.League during the 2017–2018 season, where he went on to average 17.9 points and 7.4 rebounds per game. After starting the season with Verdirrojo de Montevideo in the Liga Uruguaya de Basketball, Martin signed with Bahía Basket of the Argentine Liga Nacional de Básquet in January 2019. He was released by Bahía in end of April 2019.

References

External links
 Concordia Cavaliers bio 
 College statistics at sports-reference.com

1994 births
Living people
American expatriate basketball people in Japan
American men's basketball players
Basketball players from Oregon
Concordia Cavaliers men's basketball players
Forwards (basketball)
New Mexico Highlands Cowboys basketball players
Sportspeople from Beaverton, Oregon
Sunset High School (Beaverton, Oregon) alumni
Tokyo Cinq Rêves players